Haytham Manna (al-Awdat) is a Syrian writer; he spent three decades as a human rights activist who helped create and became spokesperson for the Arab Commission for Human Rights (ACHR). In 2011, during the early stages of the Syrian civil war, he resigned as spokesperson of the ACHR and helped create and become spokesperson of the National Coordination Committee for Democratic Change (NCC), one of the two main opposition groups active in the uprising that became a civil war. Manna lives in Paris. In 2015, he was elected co-chairperson of the Syrian Democratic Council, a newly founded umbrella organisation of secular, democratic, non-Islamist opposition in Syria.

Values–Citizenship–Rights Movement
While holding the position of spokesperson for the NCC, Manna launched the Values–Citizenship–Rights Movement (QMH) and was elected to the General Federal Assembly of the Syrian Democratic Council (SDC) as a QMH member.

Manna became a co-leader of the SDC assembly, but resigned from the role on 19 March 2016 in protest at the council's announcement of a federal system for Northern Syria, i.e. at the creation of the Democratic Federation of Northern Syria.
Selected Works 
 Islam et heresies: L’obsession blasphematoire. Harmattan, 1997, .
 L’Algérie contemporaine – bilan et solutions pour sortir de la crise. Harmattan, 2000, .
 Human Rights in the Arab-Islamic Culture. Cairo Institute for Human Rights Studies, 1996.
 Citizenship in Arab-Islamic History, Cairo Institute for Human Rights Studies, 1997.
 "Es kann gelingen – demokratischer Wandel in Syrien" In: Wolfgang Gehrcke/Christiane Reymann (Hg.), Syrien. Wie man einen säkularen Staat zerstört und eine Gesellschaft islamisiert, PapyRossa Verlag 2013, .
 DAECH, L'Etat de la barbarie, Point de Repère, Paris; 2014 
 Islam and Women's Rights, SIHR, Geneva 2015
 Les Parias de Damas, Les Points sur les I, Paris, 2016 
 Ocalanism, Ideological Construction and Practice, Scandinavian Institute for Human Rights, Geneva, 2017 
 La Chute de l'Islam politique, Hachette-Antoine, 2021, 
 Big sticks: The Lie Industry, The Philosophy of Defeat in Hybrid Wars (Russia/Ukraine), SIHR, Germany, 2022,

References

External links
 guardian.co.uk/profile/haytham-manna
 haythammanna.net

Living people
Syrian writers
People of the Syrian civil war
Syrian expatriates in France
Year of birth missing (living people)